Joseph Partridge may refer to:
Joseph Partridge (historian) (1724–1796), English clergyman, schoolteacher and historian
Joseph Edward Crawshay Partridge (1879–1965), Welsh rugby union player and soldier
Joe Partridge (1932–1988), South African cricketer